Lanchères is a commune in the Somme department in Hauts-de-France in northern France.

Geography

Population

Personalities
Paul Vimereu, author, spent his childhood at Lanchères 
Jean de Poutrincourt from Poutrincourt, a hamlet of Lanchères. He set sail in 1605 for Acadia, (nowadays Nova Scotia), to be Lieutenant-general. The ruins of his château can still be seen at Poutrincourt.

See also
Communes of the Somme department
Réseau des Bains de Mer
Chemin de Fer de la Baie de Somme

References

External links

Jean de Poutricourt information 

Communes of Somme (department)